The BCL 102 is a lightweight, 7.62×51mm, magazine-fed, gas-operated semi-automatic rifle.

History
Black Creek Labs introduced the BCL 102 in 2017. This rifle reportedly takes its roots from the NEA102, which is derived from the Armalite AR 102 (which pre-dates the AR-15), hence the numerals "102" in its name.

First Gen
Circa Aug 2017. First public release with collaboration with North Eastern Arms.

Second Gen
Circa Dec 2017. Changes from the first wave include: ambidextrous bolt release, redesigned upper receiver, redesigned brass deflector, redesigned BCL logo, redesigned bolt catch, addition of a trigger guard lowering gate, and flared magazine well, the charging handle was replaced by an ambidextrous in-house model. The stock was also changed to a "Captain Hook" style. The barrel nut now has lightening holes in it.

This generation was still designed and produced under the management of North Eastern Arms. Customers reportedly were having common extraction and ejection issues with their firearm.

Third Generation
Circa Summer 2018. Black Creek takes over all manufacturing and design from North Eastern Arms to rectify the consistent problems of extraction and ejection.

March 2019 BCL released a public recall statement:

"It has been determined that a previous extractor recall did not completely solve the issue, so further investigation, testing and evaluation was required and is now completed.  It is now understood that any 102s with extraction or ejection issues should contact warranty support for an “extraction/ejection repair kit.”  Kits may vary based on individual symptoms, but at minimum, the kit will include a new generation extractor and a new set of “made in Canada” gas rings developed and manufactured specifically for the 102."

Customers claim that the repair kit resolved their issues with extraction and ejection.

Features
As delivered, a Wave 2 rifle weighs approx. 8.9lbs.

Operating mechanism
The rifle action operates on a direct impingement system. The BCL 102 operates in a similar fashion to the popular Colt AR 15.

Upper receivers
The upper receiver incorporates the fore stock, the charging handle, the gas operating system, the barrel, the bolt and bolt carrier assembly. The BCL 102 employ a modular design. Thus one upper receiver can quickly and easily be substituted for another. Upper receivers are available with barrels of different weights, lengths, calibers, and rail systems with various sights and accessories. The standard BCL 102 rifle uses an 18.5" barrel, to be legally categorized as a non-restricted firearm in Canada.

Charge Handle
BCL uses an ambidextrous rear charging handle. Some users have reported that third party charge handle require shaving off some of the material off the 'ears' of these handles. This seems to affect Wave 2 rifles only.

Lower receivers
The lower receiver incorporates the magazine well, the pistol grip, the buttstock, the buffer and the buffer spring. The lower receiver also contains the trigger, disconnector, hammer and fire selector (collectively known as the fire control group).

Sights
The BCL 102 uses standard picatinny rails, which allows the use of various scopes and sighting devices.

Muzzle devices
The BCL 102's barrel has standard 5/8" x 24 threading on the end, which allows a variety of muzzle devices to be installed on it. As of Wave 2, they come with a flash hider installed.

Magazines
The BCL 102 uses 10-20-30-round staggered-column AR-10/SR-25 style magazines. Due a clause in Canada's magazine restrictions the maximum amount limit allowed is 10 rounds while using a XCR-M pistol magazine. All other common magazines available are pinned or physically limited to 5 rounds per Canadian law.

Platform

There is a vast assortment of aftermarket parts and accessories available for the BCL 102. Including: Barrels, Magazines, Bolt Carrier Groups, Charging Handles, Furniture & Stock Kits, Picatinny Rails, Muzzle Devices, Trigger Groups, Bi-Pods, Lasers, Tactical Lights, Carry Handles, Sights, Scopes and Optics, to name a few.

BCL 102 MK7 & MK7X
The BCL 102 MK7 & MK7X are upgraded models of the 102. Introduced in November 2019, they are offered in two chamberings:

 .308 Winchester
 6.5mm Creedmoor

The MK7 and MK7X were the first firearms that was fully redesigned and manufactured by Black Creek Labs. Earlier models of the BCL102 were operated under the control of company affiliate North Eastern Arms.

Gallery

See also
 Modern sporting rifle
 Robinson Armament XCR
 BCL SLR Coyote

References

7.62×51mm NATO semi-automatic rifles